Filip Matović (born 6 February 1995) is a Serbian footballer, who plays as a defender for GSP Polet Dorćol.

Club career

OFK Beograd
Matović is a product of OFK Beograd's youth school. He signed a scholarship contract with the institution in 2012. In 2014, he signed his first professional contract along with his teammates Miloš Ostojić, Milan Gajić and Dejan Dražić. As a captain of a youth generation, he promoted in first team player. 2014 he spent in Serbian 3rd tier club Dinamo Pančevo, where he gained his first senior experience, and made 16 appearances. In the winter-break of the 2014–15 season, OFK Beograd brought him back to their squad. He made his professional debut for OFK Beograd in Serbian SuperLiga on 21 March 2015 in a home win against Borac Čačak. Matović scored his first goal for the club in the last fixture match of the 2014–15 Serbian SuperLiga campaign against Jagodina. Matović also stayed as a back-up choice during the 2015–16 campaign, having played 4 league matches as also a single cup appearance. After the club relegated to the Serbian First League, Matović had been elected for the club captain for the 2016–17 campaign. Next the end of contract with the club, Matović released in the mid-season.

Rad
In summer 2017, Matović joined Rad as a single player. He officially promoted in new club on 21 July same year, when he signed a three-year contract and was also ordered number 4 jersey. During the first half of the 2017–18 campaign, Matović failed to make any official appearance for Rad, after which both sides mutually terminated the contract and he left the club in the winter break off-season as a free agent. Later he moved to the Serbian League Belgrade side GSP Polet Dorćol.

Career statistics

References

External links
 Filip Matović stats at utakmica.rs 
 
 
 

1995 births
Living people
Footballers from Belgrade
Association football defenders
Serbian footballers
OFK Beograd players
FK Dinamo Pančevo players
FK Rad players
Serbian First League players
Serbian SuperLiga players